Kerema Urban LLG is a local-level government (LLG) of Gulf Province, Papua New Guinea.

Wards
81. Kerema Town

References

Local-level governments of Gulf Province